Mandoza Renteria Mauricio (born 28 December 1981) is a Colombian professional football player.

References

External links
 
 
 

Living people
1981 births
Colombian footballers
Colombian expatriate footballers
Deportes Quindío footballers
América de Cali footballers
Club Universitario de Deportes footballers
Club Alianza Lima footballers
Independiente Medellín footballers
Millonarios F.C. players
Étoile Sportive du Sahel players
Atlético Bucaramanga footballers
Gyeongnam FC players
Deportivo Táchira F.C. players
Estudiantes de Mérida players
Deportivo Miranda F.C. players
Deportes Tolima footballers
Llaneros F.C. players
C.D. FAS footballers
Expatriate footballers in Peru
Expatriate footballers in Tunisia
Expatriate footballers in South Korea
Expatriate footballers in Venezuela
Expatriate footballers in El Salvador
Categoría Primera A players
K League 1 players
Association football wingers